Kasba Assembly constituency is an assembly constituency in Purnia district in the Indian state of Bihar.

Overview
As per Delimitation of Parliamentary and Assembly constituencies Order, 2008, No 58 Kasba Assembly constituency is composed of the following: Kasba, Srinagar and Jalalgarh community development blocks; Kohbara, Bela Rikabganj and Jhunni Istambrar gram panchayats of Krityanand Nagar CD Block.

Kasba Assembly constituency is part of No 12 Purnia (Lok Sabha constituency).

Members of Legislative Assembly

Election results    

In the 2010 state assembly elections, Md. Afaque Alam of Congress won the Kasba, seat defeating his nearest rival Pradip Kumar Das of [[Bharatiya Janata
 
Party|BJP]]. Contests in most years were multi cornered but only winners and runners up are being mentioned. Pradip Kumar Das of BJP defeated Md. Afaque Alam representing RJD in October 2005. Md. Afaque Alam representing SP defeated Pradip Kumar Das of BJP in February 2005. Pradip Kumar Das of BJP defeated Md. Afaque Alam, Independent, in 2000 and Shiv Charan Mehta of JD in 1995. Shiv Charan Mehta of JD defeated Md. Yasin of Congress in 1990. Syed Gulam Hussein of Congress defeated Sheo Charan Mehta of Lok Dal in 1985. Md. Yasin of Congress defeated Shiv Charan Mehta of Janata Party (Secular – Charan Singh) in 1980. Jai Narayan Mehta of Congress defeated Bhubneshwar Arya of JP in 1977.

Hayat Ashraf
The Plurals Party
Youngest Candidate Kasba Assembly 2020
Assembly election

Legistlative Elections 2020

References

External links
 

Assembly constituencies of Bihar
Politics of Purnia district